Wadsworth Union Church is a historic church at the junction of Lincoln Hwy and Railroad Avenue in Wadsworth, Nevada.

It was built in 1888 and added to the National Register of Historic Places in 2004.

It is a small church, just  in area. It was deemed significant "for its historical association with the general patterns of social life in the railroad town of Wadsworth, Nevada during the late nineteenth and early twentieth centuries."

References

Churches on the National Register of Historic Places in Nevada
Carpenter Gothic church buildings in Nevada
Churches completed in 1888
National Register of Historic Places in Washoe County, Nevada